The men's 400 metre freestyle competition of the swimming events at the 1967 Pan American Games took place on 29 July at the Pan Am Pool. The last Pan American Games champion was Roy Saari of US.

This race consisted of eight lengths of the pool, with all eight being in the freestyle stroke.

Results
All times are in minutes and seconds.

Heats

Final 
The final was held on July 29.

References

Swimming at the 1967 Pan American Games